Vladimir Kirillovich Svetilko (28 September 1915 – ?) was a Russian lightweight weightlifter. In 1950 he won a European title, set a world record in the press, and won a bronze medal at the world championship. He was the Soviet lightweight champion between 1948 and 1951.

References

1915 births
Date of death unknown
Soviet male weightlifters
European Weightlifting Championships medalists
World Weightlifting Championships medalists